The 2004 Hazfi Cup Final was a two-legged football tie in order to determine the 2003–04 Hazfi Cup champion of Iranian football clubs. Sepahan faced Esteghlal in this final game.. The first leg took place on July 8, 2004 at Naghsh Jahan Stadium in Esfahan and the second leg took place on July 15, 2004 at Azadi Stadium, Tehran.

Format 
The rules for the final were exactly the same as the one in the previous knockout rounds. The tie was contested over two legs with away goals deciding the winner if the two teams were level on goals after the second leg. If the teams could still not be separated at that stage, then extra time would have been played with a penalty shootout (taking place if the teams were still level after extra time).

Route to the final

Final Summary

First Leg

Second Leg

Champions

See also 
 Iran Pro League 2003–04
 2003–04 Azadegan League
 2003–04 Iran Football's 2nd Division
 2003–04 Iran Football's 3rd Division
 2003–04 Hazfi Cup
 2003–04 Iranian Futsal Super League
 Iranian Super Cup

Haz
2004
Esteghlal F.C. matches
Sepahan S.C. matches